Clay Township is one of 13 townships in St. Joseph County, in the U.S. state of Indiana. As of the 2000 census, its population was 39,145.

Geography

Cities, towns, villages
 Georgetown
 Granger (west quarter)
 Indian Village
 Mishawaka (partial)
 Roseland
 South Bend (partial)

Census Designated Places
Notre Dame (Partial)

Unincorporated towns
 Dreamwold Heights at 
 Maple Lane at 
 State Line at 
(This list is based on USGS data and may include former settlements.)

Adjacent townships
 Milton Township, Cass County, Michigan (northeast)
 Harris Township (east)
 Penn Township (southeast)
 Portage Township (southwest)
 Bertrand Township, Berrien County, Michigan (west)
 German Township (west)
 Niles Township, Berrien County, Michigan (northwest)

Cemeteries
The township contains Stuckey Cemetery.

Major highways

Lakes
 Juday Lake
 Tawny Lake

Landmarks
 Saint Mary's College (north quarter)
 University of Notre Dame (partial)
 St. Patrick's Farm was listed on the National Register of Historic Places in 2013.

School districts
 South Bend Community School Corporation

Political districts
 Indiana's 2nd congressional district
 State House District 5
 State House District 6
 State House District 8
 State Senate District 10
 State Senate District 11

References
 United States Census Bureau 2008 TIGER/Line Shapefiles
 United States Board on Geographic Names (GNIS)
 IndianaMap

External links
 Indiana Township Association
 United Township Association of Indiana

Townships in St. Joseph County, Indiana
South Bend – Mishawaka metropolitan area
Townships in Indiana